Marlon Javier Piedrahita Londoño (born 13 June 1985) is a Colombian professional footballer who plays as a right back for Junior on loan from Independiente Medellín. He can also play as a defensive midfielder. He was a member of Colombia U-20 in 2002 and 2003.

Honours

Club

Atlético Nacional
Categoría Primera A (2): 2007–I, 2007–II

Independiente Medellín
Categoría Primera A (1): 2016–I

Junior
Categoría Primera A (2): 2018–II, 2019-I
Copa Colombia (1): 2017
Superliga Colombiana (1): 2019

External links
 
 BDFA profile 

1985 births
Living people
Footballers from Medellín
Colombian footballers
Alianza Petrolera players
Atlético Nacional footballers
Envigado F.C. players
Deportes Tolima footballers
Águilas Doradas Rionegro players
Deportivo Pasto footballers
Once Caldas footballers
Association football defenders
21st-century Colombian people